American singer Zendaya has released one studio album, 10 singles, three promotional singles, 15 music videos and some album appearances. Her first appearance was as part of Kidz Bop Kids on the album Kidz Bop Dance Party, in 2010. In 2011, Zendaya released her debut independent single, "Swag It Out". Her next single, "Watch Me", peaked at number 86 on the US Billboard Hot 100.

On August 8, 2012, Zendaya signed to Hollywood Records and begun writing songs for her debut album. Her debut single, "Replay", was released on July 16, 2013, produced by Mick Schultz and written by Tiffany Fred and Paul "Phamous" Shelton. Her debut album, Zendaya, was released on September 17, 2013, and reached number 51 on the US Billboard 200.

On March 6, 2015, Timbaland confirmed that he would be working with Zendaya on her second album. Speaking on the album, Zendaya told MTV News that the music is a "new wave of R&B. It's where I think it should be going, or it should be headed; it's very old-school vibe, but it's a new age version." In July 2015, Zendaya posted a snippet of a song produced by Timbaland on Instagram. Following this, she appeared on a radio station in Dubai and premiered a longer snippet of the song entitled "Close Up". On November 8, 2015, she posted another video of her lip-syncing to an R&B song which would be included on her then-upcoming album. A promotional music video for the song was released by Hunger TV on November 12, 2015. On January 1, 2016, it was reported that Zendaya's second album would be released in February, and be preceded by the single "Something New", featuring Chris Brown; the single was released on February 5 via Hollywood Records and Republic Records. The song also marks it as her first official release since signing to Republic Records.

Studio albums

Extended plays

Singles

As lead artist

As featured artist

Promotional singles

Other charted songs

Other appearances

Notes

References

External links 
 
 

Discography
Zendaya
Discographies of American artists